The Moroccan Symphony is a 2006 Moroccan film directed by Kamal Kamal. It was Morocco's submission to the 79th Academy Awards for the Academy Award for Best Foreign Language Film, but was not accepted as a nominee.

Plot 
The movie is an homage to two songs, Dart bina doura of Jil Jilala and Khlili of Lemchaheb. The movie depicts how great music can act as a social elevator. The main role is played by the singer and composer Younès Megri.

Description 
The Moroccan Symphony is the second movie of Kamal Kamal. It was featured during the 8th Festival national du film (FNF) in Tanger.

See also
Cinema of Morocco
List of submissions to the 79th Academy Awards for Best Foreign Language Film

References

External links

2006 films
Moroccan musical films
2000s musical films